National System of Protected Areas (Spanish: Sistema Nacional de Áreas Protegidas) SINAP, is the Nicaraguan national parks administrator, and is part of the Nicaraguan Ministry of Environment and Natural Resources (MARENA).

SINAP is entrusted to the territorial delegation of MARENA for each department and is carried out thanks to the participation of the municipalities and non-governmental organizations, through a co-management model.

Protected areas
Nicaragua has 78 protected areas which cover 18% of its landmass, SINAP categorizes each of them as:

 Nature Reserves
 Genetic Resources Reserves
 Nature Sanctuaries
 Private Nature Reserves
 National Monuments
 Historical Monuments

See also

Protected areas of Nicaragua
Wildlife of Nicaragua
Government of Nicaragua

References

External links
MARENA - government website

Nature conservation in Nicaragua
Environment of Nicaragua
National park administrators